A general election was held in the U.S. state of Minnesota on November 6, 2018. All of Minnesota's executive officers were up for election as well as all the seats in the Minnesota House of Representatives, several judicial seats, two United States Senate seats, Minnesota's eight seats in the United States House of Representatives, and several seats for local offices. Special elections were also held for a Minnesota Senate seat and Minnesota's Class 2 U.S. Senate seat. A primary election to nominate Republican and Democratic–Farmer–Labor (DFL) candidates and several judicial and local primary elections were held on August 14, 2018.

Background 
The DFL has held all of Minnesota's executive offices since 2011 after Mark Dayton was elected governor in the 2010 gubernatorial election. They have held the office of attorney general since 1971 and the offices of secretary of state and state auditor since 2007. The Republicans have controlled the Minnesota House of Representatives since 2015 and the Minnesota Senate since 2017.

The DFL has held both of Minnesota's U.S. Senate seats since 2009 when Al Franken defeated Republican incumbent Norm Coleman after a protracted recount following the [2008 [United States Senate election in Minnesota|2008 election]]. Lieutenant Governor Tina Smith was appointed in January 2018 to replace Franken after he resigned following sexual harassment allegations. The DFL has held Minnesota's other U.S. Senate seat since 2001, when Mark Dayton defeated Republican incumbent Rod Grams in 2000. Dayton did not seek re-election in the 2006 election and was succeeded by Amy Klobuchar in 2007.

The Republican and DFL parties held caucuses on February 6, 2018, in which eligible voters elected delegates that subsequently endorsed candidates at conventions held later in the year. Both parties also held a nonbinding preference ballot for governor.

Electoral system
Elections for state and federal offices were held via first-past-the-post voting, each producing a single winner. Nominations for parties with major party status, the Republican and DFL parties, were determined by an open primary election. The candidate that won the most votes in each party became their party's nominee in the general election. If only a single candidate sought the nomination for each party, those candidates were automatically nominated and a primary election for that office was not held. Candidates for major parties had automatic ballot access. Candidates for other parties and independents were nominated by petition.

Judicial and local elections were held via the nonpartisan blanket primary. The top-two candidates that won the most votes in the primary election advanced to the general election. If not more than two candidates sought election to the same office, a primary election was not held. In multiple-winner elections, the top number of candidates that won the most votes in the primary election that were twice the number of candidates to be elected advanced to the general election. If not more than twice the number of candidates to be elected sought election, a primary election was not held. Some cities, school districts, and all townships and hospital districts did not hold a primary election, regardless of the number of candidates. Judicial and local elections were nonpartisan.

The candidate filing period was from May 22 through June 5, 2018. The filing period for cities, townships, school districts, and hospital districts that do not hold a primary election was from July 31 through August 14, 2018.

State elections

Executive elections

Governor

Incumbent DFL Governor Mark Dayton did not seek re-election, but was eligible to do so.

Hennepin County Commissioner Jeff Johnson was the Republican nominee and U.S. Representative Tim Walz was the DFL nominee. Other candidates included Grassroots-Legalize Cannabis Party candidate Chris Wright and Libertarian Party candidate Josh Welter. Candidates who lost the primary election for the Republican nomination include former Governor Tim Pawlenty and Matt Kruse. Candidates who lost the primary election for the DFL nomination include State Representative Erin Murphy, Minnesota Attorney General Lori Swanson, Tim Holden, and Olé Savior. Walz won the election.

Secretary of State

Incumbent DFL Secretary of State Steve Simon announced on January 23, 2018, that he would seek re-election. Former State Senator John Howe was the Republican nominee. William Denney sought election as an Independence Party candidate. Simon won re-election to a second term.

State Auditor

Incumbent DFL State Auditor Rebecca Otto announced on January 9, 2017, that she would not seek re-election and would seek election to be governor.

Former State Representative Pam Myhra was the Republican nominee. Julie Blaha was the DFL nominee. Other candidates included Legal Marijuana Now Party candidate Michael Ford and Libertarian Party candidate Chris Dock. Blaha won the election.

Attorney General

Incumbent DFL Attorney General Lori Swanson announced on January 28, 2018, that she would seek re-election. On June 4, 2018, Swanson announced that she would not seek re-election and instead seek election to be governor.

Former State Representative Doug Wardlow was the Republican nominee and U.S. Representative Keith Ellison was the DFL nominee. Noah Johnson sought election as a Grassroots-Legalize Cannabis Party candidate. Candidates who lost the primary election for the Republican nomination include Sharon Anderson and former State Senator Bob Lessard. Candidates who lost the primary election for the DFL nomination include State Representative Debra Hilstrom, former Ramsey County attorney Tom Foley, Matt Pelikan, and former commissioner of the Minnesota Department of Commerce Mike Rothman. Ellison won the election.

Legislative elections

Minnesota Senate (special election)

A special election was held for District 13 in the Minnesota Senate. The special election determined which political party would control the Senate as the vacancy to be filled left the Senate equally divided between the Republicans and the DFL. Jeff Howe, the Republican nominee, won the special election, preserving a one-seat Republican majority.

Minnesota House of Representatives

All 134 seats in the Minnesota House of Representatives were up for election in 2018. The Republicans held a majority of 77 seats and the DFL held 57 seats prior to the election. The DFL won a majority of 75 seats and the Republicans won 59 seats, ending a four-year Republican majority.

Judicial elections 
Four seats on the Minnesota Supreme Court were up for election. Chief Justice Lorie Skjerven Gildea and Justice Barry Anderson both won re-election unopposed. Justices Margaret Chutich and Anne McKeig were both elected in their first election following their appointments. Six seats on the Minnesota Court of Appeals and several seats on the Minnesota District Courts were also up for election.

Justice Chutich faced a challenge from conservative Michelle MacDonald, whom she beat 55.9% to 43.7%. Court of Appeals Justice Lucinda Ellen Jesson faced a challenge from human-rights lawyer Anthony L. Brown, whom she defeated 62.7% to 37.0%.

Federal elections

United States Senate

Class 1

Incumbent DFL Senator Amy Klobuchar sought re-election. State Representative Jim Newberger was the Republican nominee. Other candidates included Green Party candidate Paula Overby and Legal Marijuana Now Party candidate Dennis Schuller. Candidates who lost the primary election for the Republican nomination include Merrill Anderson, Rae Hart Anderson, and Rocky De La Fuente. Candidates who lost the primary election for the DFL nomination include Steve Carlson, Stephen Emery, David Robert Groves, and Leonard Richards. Klobuchar won re-election to a third term.

Class 2 (special election)

On December 7, 2017, incumbent DFL Senator Al Franken announced he would resign. On December 13, DFL Governor Mark Dayton announced that he would appoint Lieutenant Governor Tina Smith to replace Franken, assuming office on January 3, 2018.

Smith sought election to the seat in the special election held alongside the general election to serve the remainder of Franken's term, expiring on January 3, 2021. State Senator Karin Housley was the Republican nominee. Other candidates included Legal Marijuana Now Party candidate Sarah Wellington and independent candidate Jerry Trooien. Candidates who lost the primary election for the Republican nomination include Bob Anderson and Nikolay Bey. Candidates who lost the primary election for the DFL nomination include Richard Painter, Ali Chehem Ali, Gregg Iverson, Nick Leonard, and Christopher Seymore. Smith won election to the remaining two years of Franken's original six-year term.

United States House of Representatives

Minnesota's eight seats in the United States House of Representatives were up for election. The DFL held five seats and the Republicans held three seats prior to the election. Both parties gained and lost two seats, resulting in no net change in the number of seats held by each party.

Local elections 
Elections for several subdivisions were held—including elections for counties, municipalities, school districts, and hospital districts.

Counties
All 87 counties held regular elections. 54 counties held primary elections. Seven counties also held special elections on the day of the general election.

All counties held elections for:

 Half of the members of the county board of commissioners (including 1 special election)
 Sheriff
 County attorney

Some counties held elections for one or more of the following:

 County auditor-treasurer (51 counties)
 County auditor (8 counties)
 County treasurer (9 counties)
 County recorder (52 counties)
 County surveyor (3 counties)
 Coroner (Pipestone County)
 Half of the members of the soil and water conservation district board of supervisors (All counties except Hennepin and Ramsey, including 7 special elections)
 Half of the members of the Three Rivers Park District board of commissioners (Hennepin County excluding Minneapolis)

Municipalities
826 cities and 638 townships held regular elections. 29 cities held primary elections. 118 cities and 49 townships held special elections. Oakdale and Red Wing held special elections on both days of the primary election and general election. Benson and Saint Paul did not have regularly scheduled elections, but each held a special election on the day of the primary election. All other special elections were held on the day of the general election. Minnetonka Beach and Motley each had a ballot question on the day of the primary election. 47 cities and 23 townships had ballot questions on the day of the general election.

Cities held elections for one or more of the following:

 Mayor (717 cities, including 7 special elections)
 Half of the members of the city council (825 cities and 115 special elections in 112 cities)
 Clerk-treasurer (10 cities, including 1 special election)
 Clerk (42 cities, including 3 special elections)
 Treasurer (34 cities, including 2 special elections)
 Half of the members of the public works/utilities/sanitary district board of directors (4 cities)
 Ballot questions (49 cities)

Townships held elections for one or more of the following:

 Half of the members of the town board of supervisors (637 townships and 30 special elections in 28 townships)
 Clerk-treasurer (18 townships)
 Clerk (212 townships, including 17 special elections)
 Treasurer (343 townships, including 8 special elections)
 Ballot questions (23 townships)

School districts
284 school districts held regular elections to elect half of the members of their board of directors. Six school districts held primary elections. Braham, Eden Prairie, and Holdingford did not have regularly scheduled elections, but each held a special election on the day of the general election. 24 other school districts also held special elections on the day of the general election. Five school districts had ballot questions on the day of the primary election. 56 school districts had ballot questions on the day of the general election.

Hospital districts
16 hospital districts held regular elections to elect half of the members of their board of directors. Six hospital districts also held special elections on the day of the general election.

References

External links
Elections & Voting - Minnesota Secretary of State
Candidates at Vote Smart 
Candidates at Ballotpedia
Campaign finance at OpenSecrets

 
Minnesota